János Faházi (born 23 April 1942) is a retired Hungarian international table tennis player.

Table tennis career
He won a bronze medal in the mixed doubles with Éva Kóczián at the 1963 World Table Tennis Championships. The same years he won doubles and mixed doubles events at the English Open.

See also
 List of table tennis players
 List of World Table Tennis Championships medalists

References

 Havas, László: A magyar sport aranykönyve – Budapest, 1982 – 

1942 births
Living people
Hungarian male table tennis players
World Table Tennis Championships medalists
Table tennis players from Budapest